Annika van der Meer (born 16 December 1985) is a Dutch adaptive rower who competes at international level events. She is also a paracyclist and was a former field hockey player.

Van der Meer was involved in a serious skiing accident when she was 21 years old, she has impaired strength in the muscles and nerves of her right leg. She is a pediatric oncologist in a hospital in Utrecht.

References

1985 births
Living people
Sportspeople from The Hague
Paralympic rowers of the Netherlands
Paralympic cyclists of the Netherlands
Rowers at the 2020 Summer Paralympics
Medalists at the 2020 Summer Paralympics
21st-century Dutch women